Peter MacOwan (14 November 1830 in Hull, England – 30 November 1909 in Uitenhage, Cape Province) was a British colonial botanist and teacher in South Africa.

Early life and education
He was the son of Peter McOwan, a Wesleyan minister from Scotland. After finishing school he taught at Bath, Colchester and Leeds, and in 1857 taught chemistry at the Huddersfield College Laboratory. That same year he graduated in chemistry from the University of London, becoming professor of chemistry at Huddersfield.

Botanical work
The year before, he married Amelia Day from Bristol. A severe lung condition, possibly asthma, caused him to move to South Africa and take up the post of principal at the newly established Shaw College in Grahamstown. His health rapidly improved and leaving chemistry behind he resumed studying botany in which he had become interested while still in England, having started a collection of flowers and mosses. This interest was furthered by his association with Dr William Guybon Atherstone, Henry Hutton and Mrs. FW Barber. He entered into a fruitful exchange of specimens and correspondence with Asa Gray of the States, Sir William Hooker of Kew and with Harvey and Sonder who were working on the Flora Capensis. Finding it a drain on his own time to supply duplicates to overseas collectors, he formed the South African Botanical Exchange Society, which brought together a large number of amateur botanists. By 1868 roughly 9000 duplicates had been sent abroad, for which in return they received specimens from Europe, North America and Australia. His contributions are acknowledged in the introductions to Flora Capensis. He assisted Atherstone and HG Galpin in confirming in 1867 that the Hopetown or Eureka Diamond was indeed a diamond. Eventually he became head of natural sciences at Gill College, Somerset East, South Africa and then later director of the Cape Town Botanical Garden. During his time in Cape Town he collated specimens that Henry Flanagan from Kouga sent him. He was also the curator of the Cape Government Herbarium. Peter MacOwan's daughter Flora married Selmar Schonland in 1896.

Plant pathology as a science in South Africa formally began in 1887 with the appointment of Peter MacOwan as the consultant in economic botany to the Cape Government.

Publications

See also

References

External links 
 

 Buxus macowanii Oliv. - plant named after Peter MacOwan

Plant collectors
Botanists active in Africa
English botanists
British botanists
Alumni of the University of London
1830 births
1909 deaths
English people of Scottish descent